Job, Joris & Marieke is a Dutch animation studio founded by Job Roggeveen (1979), Joris Oprins (1980) and Marieke Blaauw (1979).

History
They met during their studies at the Design Academy Eindhoven. Joris and Job graduated in 2003 and Marieke in 2002. From 2004 to 2005 Joris and Marieke worked as animators on the stop motion series Miffy at the animation studio Pedri in Ankeveen. In 2007 they founded their studio in Utrecht. They work on commissioned work, music videos and animated short films.

The music for all their films is being composed by Job who is also a musician. In 2010 Job started the music project Happy Camper for which he won an Edison Award. Job, Joris & Marieke worked on the artwork and the music videos for both of the studio albums Happy Camper released.

In 2011 Job, Joris & Marieke created the music video for the song Ik Neem Je Mee by Dutch rapper Gers Pardoel. Over 19 million people watched the music video on YouTube.

In 2012 Dutch broadcaster KRO aired the children series The Tumblies. Job, Joris & Marieke worked on the concept, the character design and the music.

In 2013 they released their animated short film MUTE. MUTE won, among others, the Grand Prix and the audience award at the Holland Animatie Film Festival in 2013.

As part of Ultrakort, Job, Joris & Marieke created the animated short film A Single Life in 2014. The film was screened in front of the Dutch box office hit Gooische Vrouwen 2 in all Pathé cinemas. In 2015 the film was nominated for an Academy Awards for Best Animated Short Film, and for the Cartoon d’Or. Also the film won over 15 international awards.

In 2014 the City of Utrecht commissioned Job, Joris & Marieke to make the short film/music video Bon Voyage! This film was to promote the start of the Tour de France in Utrecht in 2015. The title song Bon Voyage! was composed by Dutch singer songwriter Blaudzun

In 2015 they made the animated short film (Otto) as part of NTR KORT!. The film had its international premiere at the Toronto International Film Festival. (Otto) was chosen to be the official Dutch entry for the Academy® Award Best Animated Short Film 2016. ALCINE kids premiere at the Alcalá de Henares Film Festival in 2016.

In 2016 studio Job, Joris & Marieke released their short film Kop Op (Heads Together), in co-production with Viking Film and Dutch broadcaster VPRO, which won the Grand Prix Short at the New York International Children's Film Festival.  They also released their first children's book Wie Doet Dat Toch? together with publisher Kluitman.

In 2018 they released the children's book De Happy Camper, Manfreds Kampeer & Survivalgids, also together with publisher Kluitman. And they released their animated short film A Double Life, which was nominated for a Gouden Kalf at the Netherlands Film Festival in 2018.

In 2019 their short film Kop Op (Heads Together) won the International Emmy Kids Award in the category: Animation. 

In 2022 they made children series SWOP (Kop Op) together with Viking Film and the Dutch broadcaster VPRO. The main characters were voiced by the actors Nasrdin Dchar, Paulien Cornelisse and Steye van Dam. SWOP has 12 episodes of each ten minutes. SWOP was nominated for a Cinekid Award in the category Best Dutch Fiction Series.

On the 26th of February 2022 they opened their exposition A Triple Life in the Kunsthal Rotterdam. At this exposition they showed a collection of their work and a video map installation called Nobody especially made for this exposition. 

Animated Short Films
 2003: Wad
 2003: How Snjezhi Tjelovek Found His Ancestors
 2005: Niet te Geloven 
 2006: Moi
 2008: It's not funny, it's art! 
 2013: MUTE
 2014: A Single Life
 2015: (Otto)
 2016: Kop Op (Heads Together)
 2018: A Double Life
 2022: Nobody

Music videos
 2010: Happy Camper - Born With A Bothered Mind
 2011: Gers Pardoel - Ik Neem Je Mee
 2013: Fit - Duurt Te Lang
 2014: Happy Camper - The Daily Drumbeat
 2014: RICO & A.R.T. - Naaktslak
 2014: RICO & A.R.T. - Zombie
 2014: RICO & A.R.T. - Opa
 2014: Blaudzun - Bon Voyage!
 2015: Fedde Le Grand - Robotic
 2019: Kinderen Voor Kinderen - Reis Mee!

Books 
 2016: Wie Doet Dat Toch? (Who Did That?)
 2018: De Happy Camper, Manfreds Kampeer & Survivalgids

References

External links 
Job, Joris & Marieke website 
Job, Joris & Marieke on IMDB
Job, Joris & Marieke on Vimeo
Job, Joris & Marieke interview on Cartoon Brew

Animation studios
Dutch animation